Steven Leslie Hooker OAM (born 16 July 1982) is an Australian former pole vaulter and Olympic gold medalist. His personal best, achieved in 2008, is  making him the fourth-highest pole vaulter in history, behind Sergey Bubka, Renaud Lavillenie and Armand Duplantis.

Hooker was born in Melbourne, Victoria, and has a personal best of 10.82 s in 100 m as an amateur sprinter. He ran in the 2010 Stawell Gift.

Career
Hooker won gold at the 2008 Beijing Olympics with a vault of 5.96 metres, setting a new Olympic record, and making him the first Australian male track and field gold medallist in 40 years since Ralph Doubell won the 800 metres in Mexico City in 1968.

At the 2009 World Athletics Championships, in Berlin, Hooker won the gold medal despite a hamstring injury.  On only his second jump, Hooker cleared 5.90 metres, to win the gold medal after missing 5.85 metres on his first attempt.

At the 2010 IAAF World Indoor Championships, Hooker won the gold medal in the pole vault with a vault of 6.01 metres, a championship record.

At the 2010 Commonwealth Games, Hooker won the gold medal in the pole vault.

Hooker competed at the 2012 London Olympics and finished 14th after failing to vault a height in the final.

Hooker joined six-metre club for the first time on 27 January 2008 at an outdoor competition in Perth, Western Australia with a vault of 6.0m. On 7 February 2009, at the Boston Indoor Games he set an Australian indoor record with a vault of 6.06m. Both heights were the Australian record at the time of his retirement.

During his career he was coached by Mark Stewart and Alex Parnov.

He retired from athletics in April 2014, choosing to focus on his family, his wife Yekaterina Kostetskaya having given birth to their first son, Maxim, in 2013.

Honours
In the 2009 Australia Day Honours, Steve Hooker was awarded the Medal of the Order of Australia (OAM) "For service to sport as a Gold Medallist at the Beijing 2008 Olympic Games". In October 2017, Hooker was inducted into the Sport Australia Hall of Fame as an athlete member.

Personal life
Hooker attended Greythorn Primary School and Balwyn High School in Balwyn North, Victoria.

His mother Erica Hooker was a 1972 Olympian and a 1978 Commonwealth Games long jump silver medalist. She also won nine national titles. His father Bill represented Australia in the 800 m and 4 x 400 m at the 1974 Commonwealth Games and won four national crowns.

He began his career with the Box Hill Athletic Club. His career started slowly, and he only went professional in 2006. He relocated to Perth, living on a very modest Australian Sports Commission allowance.

Summary of athletic achievements

See also
 6 metres club

References

External links

Steve Hooker personal website
Steven Hooker at Australian Athletics Historical Results

Living people
1982 births
Australian male pole vaulters
Olympic athletes of Australia
Olympic gold medalists for Australia
Athletes (track and field) at the 2004 Summer Olympics
Athletes (track and field) at the 2008 Summer Olympics
Athletes (track and field) at the 2012 Summer Olympics
Commonwealth Games medallists in athletics
Medalists at the 2008 Summer Olympics
Athletes (track and field) at the 2006 Commonwealth Games
Athletes (track and field) at the 2010 Commonwealth Games
Recipients of the Medal of the Order of Australia
Athletes from Melbourne
Commonwealth Games gold medallists for Australia
Track and field athletes from Western Australia
World Athletics Championships medalists
World Athletics Championships athletes for Australia
Olympic gold medalists in athletics (track and field)
Sport Australia Hall of Fame inductees
World Athletics Indoor Championships winners
IAAF Continental Cup winners
World Athletics Championships winners
Medallists at the 2010 Commonwealth Games